Trodds Copse is a 25.23 hectare biological Site of Special Scientific Interest (SSSI), in central Hampshire, notified in 1989. It comprises ancient semi-natural woodland, unimproved meadows and flushes.

Location
The copse is situated to the north-west of Chandler's Ford between Flexford Road and Hook Road and adjoins the Eastleigh to Romsey railway line.

Description
The citation for the SSSI says:Trodds Copse Site of Special Scientific Interest comprises ancient semi-natural woodland, unimproved meadows and flushes overlying Bracklesham Beds, Bagshot Sand, peat and alluvium. The habitats are drained by tributaries of the Monks Brook, a branch of the River Itchen. The diverse geology and varied drainage conditions give rise to a wide range of habitats. At least ten woodland types can be identified, of which four are considered nationally rare. The diversity of woodland types is matched by an extremely rich ground flora. The antiquity of the woodlands is reflected in the very high number of ancient woodland indicator species recorded within the site. Over fifty such species occur, including a number of rare or local plants such as tutsan (Hypericum androsaemum) making it one of the botanically richest woods in Hampshire.

History
Trodds Copse and surrounding land has been well documented since the late 16th century. The whole site was enclosed from common land prior to 1588 and woodland boundary banks can be clearly discerned. Some areas were managed as wood pasture but by the early 19th century this practice had ceased, the land being converted to pasture or coppice woodland.

The site is threatened by the north-westerly expansion of Chandler's Ford. In 1990, a planning application to build 200 houses and a golf course at neighbouring Broadgate Farm, Ampfield was refused as it "would result in the destruction of part of the Trodds Copse Countryside Heritage Site".

Flora

Among the many tree and plant species found at Trodds Copse are:

Maple Acer campestre
Alder  Alnus glutinosa
Common Hazel Corylus avellana
Alder buckthorn Frangula alnus
Common Ash Fraxinus excelsior
Pedunculate Oak Quercus robur
Rowan Sorbus aucuparia
Sneezewort Achillea ptarmica
Velvet bent Agrostis canina
Tall oat Arrhenatherum elatius
 
Marsh marigold Caltha palustris
Brown sedge Carex disticha
Smooth-stalked sedge C. laevigata
Tussock sedge C. paniculata 
Remote sedge C. remota 
Opposite-leaved golden saxifrage Chrysosplenium oppositifolium
Purple loosestrife Epipactis purpurata
Meadowsweet Filipendula ulmaria
Marsh bedstraw Galium palustre 
Fen bedstraw G. uliginosum 
Water avens Geum rivale
Ivy Hedera helix 
Yorkshire fog Holcus lanatus 
Tutsan Hypericum androsaemum

Sharp-flowered rush Juncus acutiflorus
Yellow archangel Lamiastrum galeobdolon
Honeysuckle Lonicera periclymenum
Gipysywort Lycopus europaeus
Yellow loosestrife Lysimachia vulgaris
Cyclamen-flowered Daffodil Narcissus cyclamineus 
Bramble Rubus fruticosus
Wood club rush Scirpus sylvaticus
Bog mosses including 
Sphagnum palustre
S. flexuosum
Sphagnum recurvum var. mucronatum
Devil’s bit scabious Succisa pratensis
Branched bur-reed Sparganium erectum

Fauna

The wide range of habitats is reflected by the diverse invertebrate fauna present within the site, including:
Hoverfly  Criorhina asilica
Robber fly Choerades marginatus
Solitary bee Macropis europaea
Tachinid fly Phasia hemiptera
Hoverfly  Volucella inflata

References

External links
 Natural England website (SSSI information)
 Map of the SSSI 
 

Sites of Special Scientific Interest in Hampshire
Sites of Special Scientific Interest notified in 1989
Test Valley